The Corpus Christi Harbor Bridge is a through arch bridge located in Corpus Christi, Texas which carries six lanes of U.S. Route 181 (US 181) and Texas State Highway 35 (SH 35) from downtown Corpus Christi to Rincon Point, known to locals as North Beach. The harbor bridge crosses the Corpus Christi Ship Channel and handles nearly 26,000 vehicles daily. A new bridge called the New Harbor Bridge is currently under construction. When complete it will allow larger ships to pass beneath, permit safer pedestrian transit, and reconfigure the entire highway interchange system in the surrounding community.
    


Geography
The entire bay ecosystem is protected from the Gulf of Mexico by barrier islands. Mustang Island and San Jose Island are the two principal landmasses that shield the Aransas and Corpus Christi Bays from the wider Gulf of Mexico. Inland from Corpus Christi Bay is Nueces Bay, the outlet for the Nueces River. The Nueces and Corpus Christi bays are separated by a sandbar anchored on the south end by Rincon Point peninsula and Indian Point peninsula on the north. Just south of Rincon Point was a small natural channel called Hall's Bayou.

History

Hall's Bayou Bridge
In the 1880s, a small wooden bridge was erected over Hall's Bayou, then little more than a muddy slough, to allow access to Rincon Point.

Bascule Bridge
A 1920s era federal Rivers and Harbors Act authorized dredging a channel 25 feet deep and 200 feet wide from the Gulf Of Mexico, through Aransas Pass and on into Hall's Bayou. Dredging was completed and the port was opened, in 1926. The Act also authorized the construction of a 121 foot long, 52 foot wide bascule-type drawbridge. The bridge was built by the Wisconsin Bridge and Iron Company. Upon completion it was painted black and coated in grease to inhibit corrosion. Bridge operations were complex, consisting of whistled signals between approaching ships and bridge operators. Every ship transit took 20 minutes or more and stopped vehicular traffic for as many as 30 times each day.

Harbor Bridge
By the 1950s, the bascule bridge was a significant traffic bottleneck. As part of the nationwide Interstate Highway System, Congress authorized funding for IH-37 through Corpus Christi. This included money for the construction of a new bridge to be elevated over the channel at a height sufficient to allow the passage of ships without stopping vehicular traffic. In 1959 the current Harbor Bridge was completed, allowing ships with a maximum above-waterline height of 138 feet to pass underneath and use a wider portion of the channel than the previous drawbridge. It also included two narrow pedestrian walkways between the bridge railing and the outermost lane of traffic in each direction. Originally designed with a 50-year lifespan, the bridge will remain in service until its replacement is done, after which it will be demolished.

New Harbor Bridge Project

 In 2008 local, state, and federal authorities began the replacement process. The new Harbor Bridge will be a cable-stayed suspension bridge with a 1661-foot span, rising to a height of 538 feet at the peak of each support pylon. The bridge will allow passage of ships up to 205 feet above-waterline height. The concrete construction technique used for bridge segments have a 170-year estimated life. Construction was originally slated to finish in 2020. On October 15, 2019, it was announced that the Harbor Bridge would not be completed until 2023. On November 15, 2019, design activities on the new Harbor Bridge were suspended by the Texas Department of Transportation. In a statement, the Texas Department of Transportation says it asked Flatiron Dragados, the firm building the bridge, to suspend the design activities until a replacement for FIGG Bridge Engineers Inc. was found after the March 2018 pedestrian bridge collapse at Florida International University. In July 2020, Arup and Carlos Fernandez Casado S.L. was hired to review, recertify, and complete the main span of the bridge. In 2022, TxDOT halted construction after deficiencies were found within the superstructure of the new bridge.

Current bridge

New lighting
A new LED lighting system was unveiled to the public on December 4, 2011, at a public lighting ceremony held at Whataburger Field. The $2.2 million project was a joint venture between the City of Corpus Christi, the Port of Corpus Christi, the Texas Department of Transportation, and American Bank. The lighting system comprises more than 950 Philips Color Kinetics fixtures and has over 11,000 individually addressable RGB nodes. In June 2021, the Corpus Christi city council (along with the Port of Corpus Christi and the Texas Department of Transportation) elected to turn off and remove the LED lighting system because of corrosion to the brackets used to hold the lighting components in place. The last night the Corpus Christi Harbor Bridge lights were lit was June 13, 2021.

References

External links

Road bridges in Texas
Bridges completed in 1959
Transportation in Corpus Christi, Texas
Buildings and structures in Corpus Christi, Texas
Through arch bridges in the United States
Bridges of the United States Numbered Highway System
Bridge light displays